Candis Cayne (born August 29, 1971) is an American actress and performance artist. Cayne performed in New York City nightclubs in drag since the 1990s, and came out as transgender in 1996; Cayne came to national attention in 2007 for portraying transgender mistress Carmelita on ABC's prime time drama Dirty Sexy Money. The role makes Cayne the first transgender actress to play a recurring transgender character in primetime. She is perhaps best known for her recurring role as the Fairy Queen on the fantasy series The Magicians.

Early life
Cayne has a fraternal twin brother named Dylan. Their parents taught at a Waldorf School, and the family lived on campus. She graduated from Henry Perrine Baldwin High School in Hawaii in 1989 and then spent a year in Los Angeles, where she trained as a dancer.

Career
Cayne then moved to New York in the early 1990s, making a name for herself as a choreographer and drag performer. About three years after her arrival in NYC, Cayne realized that the term transgender described how she felt about herself. Already performing as "Candis Cayne" at New York gay bar Boy Bar and as a featured performer at Tour in New York's Chelsea, the entertainer also participated in Wigstock, the annual drag festival in Manhattan's East Village. In 1995 Cayne appeared in the related documentary film Wigstock: The Movie, the comedy-drama film Stonewall, and the Universal Studios comedy feature film To Wong Foo, Thanks for Everything! Julie Newmar, for which she also did choreography.

In 1996, she had a supporting role in the comedy-drama film Always Something Better (a.k.a. Never Look Back). In 1997 Cayne was in a documentary called Drag Time on HBO along with many other famous New York nightlife performers. Candis also co-starred in the music video for RuPaul's "A Little Bit of Love" with female impersonator Jazzmun. Cayne also starred as the title character in the 1998 independent film Mob Queen, and won the 2001 Miss Continental pageant. In 2007 Cayne was cast as Annaka Manners in the 2007 RuPaul film Starrbooty.

From 2007 to 2008 Cayne played Carmelita Rainer, a trans woman having an affair with married New York Attorney General Patrick Darling (played by William Baldwin), on the ABC prime time drama Dirty Sexy Money. She had a recurring role as the transgender character Alexis Stone in season six of Nip/Tuck. Cayne has appeared as a judge and Dean of Dance on RuPaul's Drag U. As a dance teacher, she taught contestants original choreography to "No Scrubs" by TLC and Kelis's song "Milkshake". In 2011, she guest-starred on the TV show Necessary Roughness as Geraldine.

In 2015, Cayne started making appearances in seasons 1 and 2 of Caitlyn Jenner's reality show I Am Cait.

From 2017 to 2018, Cayne played the role of The Fairy Queen in the Syfy series The Magicians. Cayne appeared in the 2020 documentary Disclosure: Trans Lives on Screen. She also hosted the third edition of Werq the World's livestreamed series.

Activism and personal life

Cayne began transitioning circa 1996. Cayne has stated, "I'm not trying to be a spokeswoman for the transgender community; I just want to be looked at as a living, breathing, happy human being." She calls the LGBT community "the last great minority" and supports LGBT+ rights charity GLAAD.

In August 2015, Candis Cayne teamed up with the global LGBT social network MOOVZ as the new global creative director.

For over eight years, ending in 2010, Cayne was in a relationship with DJ Marco McDermott, to whom she referred as her husband. During that time, she helped raise McDermott's daughter, Satori, from a previous relationship.

In 2016, during season 2 of the reality show I Am Cait, Cayne explored the possibility of adopting as a single mom.

Filmography

Film

Television

Music videos

See also
 LGBT culture in New York City
 List of LGBT people from New York City

References

External links
  
 
 Candis Cayne profile  at QueenMother.tv
 Candis Cayne hosts NewNowNext Awards for LOGO

1971 births
Living people
Actresses from Maui
American drag queens
American film actresses
American television actresses
LGBT people from Hawaii
LGBT choreographers
American LGBT rights activists
Transgender actresses
Transgender female models
American twins
Waldorf school alumni
Transgender drag performers
American LGBT actors